Romain Gavras (born 4 July 1981 in Paris, France) is a French director. He is known for directing Jamie xx's video "Gosh", Kanye West's video "No Church in the Wild" and M.I.A.'s video "Bad Girls". He also directed Justice's "Stress" and M.I.A.'s "Born Free". Gavras' films and music videos often portray a gritty setting juxtaposed with high-energy content.

His second film The World Is Yours was screened at the Directors' Fortnight during the 2018 Cannes Film Festival. His third film Athena had its premiere at the 79th Venice International Film Festival.

Biography
Gavras is the son of French film director Costa-Gavras (Konstantinos Gavras). In 1995, he co-founded the film collective Kourtrajmé with Kim Chapiron and Toumani Sangaré.

Filmography

Film

Music videos

Advertising

References

External links

Romain Gavras on AdForum
Romain Gavras on AlloCiné (in French)
Romain Gavras on Vimeo

1981 births
Living people
French film directors
French screenwriters
Greek film directors
French music video directors
French people of Greek descent
Film people from Paris